Cain and Abel is a 2009 South Korean television series starring So Ji-sub, Shin Hyun-joon, Han Ji-min, and Chae Jung-an. It aired on  SBS from February 18 to April 23, 2009 on Wednesdays and Thursdays at 21:55 for 20 episodes.

Synopsis
Based on the biblical story of Adam and Eve's first two sons, Cain and Abel is about Cain's jealousy towards his brother Abel. Lee Cho-in is a very gifted doctor who has everything that he wants whereas his older brother, Seon-woo, is jealous of all the attention that Cho-in receives. Seon-woo blames his brother for taking everything good in his life away from him: getting their father's love, getting more recognition as a doctor, and for stealing the woman he loves.

Cast
So Ji-sub as Lee Cho-in / Oh Kang-ho
Kang Yi-seok as young Cho-in
Shin Hyun-joon as Lee Seon-woo
Cha Jae-dol as toddler Seon-woo
Jung Chan-woo as young Seon-woo
Han Ji-min as Oh Young-ji
Chae Jung-an as Kim Seo-yeon
Kim Yoo-jung as young Seo-yeon
Kim Hae-sook as Na Hye-joo (Seon-woo's mother)
Jang Yong as Lee Jong-min (Seon-woo's father)
Ha Yoo-mi as Kim Hyun-joo
Kwon Hae-hyo as Kim Jin-geun
Ahn Nae-sang as Jo Hyun-taek
Yoon Ki-won as Park Soo-rak
Baek Seung-hyeon as Choi Chi-soo
Han Da-min as Lee Jung-min
Park Sung-woong as Oh Kang-chul 
Choi Jae-hwan as Seo Jin-ho
Song Jong-ho as Kang Suk-hoon
Kim Ha-kyun as Oh In-geun
Kim Myung-gook as Bang Tae-man
Seo Jin-wook as Jang Young-gyu
Han Si-yoon as Sung Jin-young
Kang Soo-min as Yang Dong-mi
Kang Yo-hwan as Uhm Dae-hyun
Yoo Joo-hee as Nam Yong-tae

Awards
2009 Grimae Awards  
Best Actor: So Ji-sub

2009 Ministry of Culture, Sports and Tourism
Actor of the Year in Broadcasting: So Ji-sub

2009 SBS Drama Awards  
Top 10 Stars - So Ji-sub
Best Supporting Actor in a Drama Special: Baek Seung-hyeon
Top Excellence Award, Actor - So Ji-sub

International broadcast
  Thailand: Channel 3 - aired beginning February 21, 2014, on Monday to Sunday nights.

References

External links
Cain and Abel official SBS website 

Seoul Broadcasting System television dramas
2009 South Korean television series debuts
2009 South Korean television series endings
Korean-language television shows
South Korean action television series